The Bobr is a river in Belarus. It is a left tributary of the Berezina.

References

Rivers of Vitebsk Region
Rivers of Minsk Region
Rivers of Belarus